Plesioscotosia is a genus of moths in the family Geometridae described by Viidalepp in 1986.

References

Larentiini